The Tesla Fault can be found in the northeastern Diablo Range, California. This fault is only semi-active.

Geology

Mocho Subbasin
The Tesla Fault forms the eastern boundary of the large aquifer known as the Mocho Subbasin.

See also
Arroyo Valle
Tassajara Formation

References

External links
USGS Database Search, Partial Report for Greenville fault zone, Marsh Creek-Greenville section (Class A) No. 53b

Seismic faults of California
Diablo Range
Geology of Contra Costa County, California
Livermore Valley